Weightlifting at the 2018 Commonwealth Games was held in the Gold Coast from April 5 to 9. The Weightlifting competition was held at the Carrara Sports and Leisure Centre. A total of eight men's and eight women's events were held.

On 7 October 2016, it was announced seven new events for women were added to the sport program, meaning there will be an equal number of events for men and women. This marks the first time in history that a major multi-sport event will have equality in terms of events. This included the addition of an additional female event in the weightlifting competitions.

Competition schedule
The following is the competition schedule for the weightlifting competitions:

Medal table

Medalists

Men's events

Women's events

Records

Men's

Women's

 Broken Records in Weightlifting

Qualification

For the first time, weightlifting athletes had to qualify for the Games. A total of 226 weightlifters (120 male and 106 women) will qualify to compete at the games. Qualification was done through multiple pathways.

Participating nations
There are 35 participating associations in weightlifting with a total of 206 athletes. The number of athletes a nation entered is in parentheses beside the name of the country.

References

External links
 Results Book – Weightlifting

 
2018 Commonwealth Games events
Commonwealth Games
2018
Weightlifting in Australia